Lalita Pawar (18 April 1916 – 24 February 1998) was a prolific Indian actress, who later became famous as a character actress, appearing in over 700 films in Hindi, Marathi and Gujarati cinema. She holds a Guinness world record of longest acting career spanning over 70 years. Pawar is the awardee of a Filmfare award for best supporting actress for Anari. She featured in hit films such as Netaji Palkar (1938), made by Bhalji Pendharkar, New Hana Pictures' Sant Damaji, Navyug Chitrapat's Amrit, written by VS Khandekar, and Chhaya Films' Gora Kumbhar. Her other memorable roles were in the films Anari (1959), Shri 420 and Mr & Mrs 55, and the role of Manthara, in Ramanand Sagar's television epic serial Ramayan.

Biography
Pawar was born as Amba Laxman Rao Sagun on 18 April 1916, into an orthodox family in Yeola in Nashik. Her father Laxman Rao Shagun was a rich silk and cotton piecegoods merchant. She started her acting career at age nine in the film Raja Harishchandra (1928), and later went on to play lead roles in the silent era and 1940s films, in a career that lasted until the end of her life, spanning seven decades.

She co-produced and acted in a silent film Kailash (1932), and later produced another film Duniya Kya Hai in 1938, a talkie.

In 1942, as a part of a scene in the movie Jung-E-Azadi, actor Master Bhagwan was to slap her hard. Being a new actor, he accidentally slapped her very hard, which resulted in facial paralysis and a burst left eye vein. Three years of treatment later, she was left with a defective left eye; thus she had to abandon lead roles, and switch to character roles, which won her much of her fame later in life.

She was known particularly for playing maternal figures, especially wicked matriarchs or mothers-in-law. She also notably played the strict but kind Mrs. L. D'Sa in Anari (1959) with Raj Kapoor. Under Hrishikesh Mukherjee's direction, she gave the performance of a lifetime, for which she received the Filmfare Best Supporting Actress Award. And as the tough matriarch who falls in love in Professor (1962), and the devious hunchback Manthara in Ramanand Sagar's television series Ramayan. She was honored by the Government of India as the first lady of Indian cinema in 1961.

Personal life
Her first marriage was to Ganpatrao Pawar, which went sour after his affair with her younger sister. She later married film producer Rajprakash Gupta, of Ambika studios, Bombay. She continued to live with her grandson Sanjay Pawar and her husband in Juhu. Her son Jai Pawar continued to become a producer and worked with her in movies like Manzil. Her son Jai Pawar had 2 sons Sanjay Pawar and Manoj Pawar. They both continue to live in Mumbai as her great- daughter Aanya Pawar. She died on 24 February 1998 in Aundh, Pune, where she had been staying for a while.

Selected filmography
{|class="wikitable"
|-
!Year !!Film !!Character
|-
|1944
|Ram Shastri
|Anandibai (wife of Peshwa Raghunathrao)
|-
|1950
|Dahej
|Mrs. Biharilal (Suraj's mother)
|-
|1951
|The Immortal Song
|Vitabai
|- 
|rowspan="2"|1952
|Daag
|Shankar (Dilip Kumar)'s Mother
|-
|Parchhain
|Badi Rani
|-
|rowspan="2"|1955
|Shri 420
|Ganga Mai
|-
|Mr & Mrs 55
|Seeta Devi, Anita's Aunt
|-
|1957
|Nau Do Gyarah
|
|-
|rowspan="2"|1959
|Anari
|Mrs. L. D'Sa
Won - Filmfare Award for Best Supporting Actress
|-
|Sujata
|Giribala, Buaji/aunt
|-
|1960
|Jhumroo
|Jhumroo Mother
Jis desh me ganga behti hai (1960)
|-
|rowspan="4"|1961
| Junglee (Film By Subodh Mukherjee)
|Shekhar's mother
|-
|Hum Dono 
|Major's Mother
|-
| Sampoorna Ramayana 
|Manthara
|-
| Memdidi
|
|-
|rowspan="2"|1962
|Professor
|Sita Devi Verma
|-
|Banarsi Thug
|
|-
|rowspan="3"|1963
|Sehra
|Angara's mother
|-
|Grahasti
|Harish Khanna's sister
|-
|Ghar Basake Dekho
|Mrs. Shanta Mehra
|-
|1964
|Sharabi
|
|-
|rowspan="3"|1966
|Phool Aur Patthar
|Mrs. Jeevan Ram
|-
|Love in Tokyo
|Gayatri Devi
|-
|Khandan
|Fufi
|-
|rowspan="2"|1967
|Boond Jo Ban Gayee Moti
|Shefali's mother
|-
|Noor Jehan
|
|-
|rowspan="4"|1968
|Ankhen
|Madam/Fake Aunt
|-
|Neel Kamal
|Thakurain
|-
|Aabroo
|Mrs. Verma
|-
|Teen Bahuraniyan
|Sita's mother
|-
|1969
|Meri Bhabhi
|Gangajali
|-
|rowspan="4"|1970
|Anand
|Matron
|-
|Pushpanjali
|Rani Sahiba
|-
|Gopi
|Lilawati devi
|-
|Darpan
|Dadima
|-
|1971
|Jwala
|
|-
|rowspan="2"|1972
|Gaon Hamara Shaher Tumhara
|Lajwanti Pandey
|-
|Bombay to Goa
|Kashibai
|-
|rowspan="3"|1974
|Hamrahi
|
|-
|Naya Din Nai Raat
|Mental Hospital Patient (Special appearance)
|-
|Doosri Sita
|Khel khel main'x
|-

|rowspan="2"|1976
|Aaj Ka Ye Ghar|Mrs. Shanti Dinanath
|-
|Tapasya|Mrs. Varma
|-
|rowspan="3"|1977
|Jay Vejay|Nandini
|-
|Prayashchit|
|-
|Aaina|Janki
|-
|1979
|Manzil|Mrs. Chandra (Ajay's mother)
|-
|rowspan="4"|1980
|Yaarana|mother
|-
|Kali Ghata|Ambu, House keeper
|-
|Phir Wohi Raat|Hostel Warden 
|-
|Sau Din Saas Ke|Bhavani Devi (Prakash's mother)
|-
|1981
|Naseeb|Mrs. Gomes
|-
|1982
|Apna Bana Lo
|Mausi
|-
|1983
|Ek Din Bahu Ka|Kalavati
|-
|rowspan="2"|1986
|Pyar Ke Do Pal|
|-
|Ghar Sansar|Satyanarayan's mother
|-
|rowspan="2"|1987
|Watan Ke Rakhwale|Radha's Maternal Grandma
|-
|Uttar Dakshin|
|-
|rowspan="2"|1988
|Zalzala|Shila's mom
|-
|Pyasi Aatma|
|-
|1989
|Bahurani|
|-
|1992
|Muskurahat|Laundry lady
|-
|1997
|Bhai 
|
|}

Television

Awards
 1960: Filmfare Award for Best Supporting Actress - Anari'' 
 1961: Sangeet Natak Akademi Award - Acting

References

External links

 
 
 Tribute to Laita Pawar at Screen
 Living the Role- Lalita Pawar The Hindu
 Interview with Lalita Pawar in her last days cineplot.com

1916 births
1998 deaths
People from Nashik
Indian film actresses
Indian silent film actresses
Actresses in Hindi cinema
Indian television actresses
Filmfare Awards winners
Actresses in Marathi cinema
Actresses in Gujarati cinema
Recipients of the Sangeet Natak Akademi Award
20th-century Indian actresses